delta was a small poetry magazine that was produced at the University of Cambridge in the 1950s and 1960s. The magazine was first published in 1954. The founder was Peter Redgrove. It was originally edited by Peter Redgrove and Rodney Banister, but Redgrove persuaded Philip Hobsbaum to take over from Issue 3. The magazine introduced various poets, including The Group figures Edward Lucie-Smith and Peter Porter. From 1972 the magazine was not edited from Cambridge. It ended publication in 1981.

Footnotes

1954 establishments in the United Kingdom
1981 disestablishments in the United Kingdom
Defunct literary magazines published in the United Kingdom
Magazines established in 1954
Magazines disestablished in 1981
Mass media in Cambridge
Poetry literary magazines
Publications associated with the University of Cambridge